Rhoda Garrett (28 March 1841 – 22 November 1882) was an English suffragist and interior designer.

With her cousin Agnes Garrett, Rhoda opened the first interior design company in Britain to be run by women. The cousins were apprenticed to London architect John McKean Brydon in 1873. R & A Garrett opened in mid 1874, in a flat behind Baker Street station, moving to 2 Gower Street in Bloomsbury mid1875.

Together they wrote and published Suggestions for House Decoration in 1876, part of the 'Art at Home' series of interior decoration and household taste manuals published by Macmillan under the general editorship of W. J. Loftie. It was illustrated with engravings of furniture and rooms, probably of their own home at Gower Street, which was also their business premises. Examples of furniture designed by the Garretts are at Standen House, including a daybed and footstools, with characteristic wedge-shaped legs. Some of these items of furniture are illustrated in Suggestions for House Decoration. R & A Garrett also decorated the home of Elizabeth Garrett Anderson, Rhoda's cousin, at 4 Upper Berkeley Street in the fashionable West End of London, to which she and her husband Skelton had moved in June 1874.

References

External links
 

1841 births
1882 deaths
English suffragists
English interior designers
People from Derbyshire